Raritan is an NJ Transit railroad station on the Raritan Valley Line, in Raritan, Somerset County, New Jersey, United States, north of the town center on Thompson Street. The station building is south of the tracks in the main parking lot and was built in the early 1890s. There are also three other small lots for this station.

Raritan is the westernmost stop served by most Raritan Valley Line trains, as well as daily service. Service between Raritan and High Bridge operates during weekdays only.

The station building has been listed in the state and federal registers of historic places since 1984 and is part of the Operating Passenger Railroad Stations Thematic Resource. It houses the local VFW Post inside. A small section is still open during the winter with heaters so passengers do not have to wait outside.

Station layout
The station has two low-level side platforms.

See also
List of New Jersey Transit stations

References

External links

world.nycsubway.org - NJT Raritan Line
Raritan Valley Line (Unofficial NJTransit Homepage)

National Register of Historic Places in Somerset County, New Jersey
NJ Transit Rail Operations stations
Railway stations in Somerset County, New Jersey
Railway stations on the National Register of Historic Places in New Jersey
Raritan, New Jersey
Former Central Railroad of New Jersey stations
Veterans of Foreign Wars buildings